Barbara Catharina Mjödh (8 November 1738 - 1776) was a Finnish poet. She was born to the vicar and politician Abraham Mjödh (died 1786) and Magdalena Ross. Mjödh wrote of great occasions in peoples' lives, such as weddings and funerals. In 1754, she published her funeral poem of Anna Gerdzlovia. She was praised for her talent, but her career is regarded to have been severely subdued because of her marriage.

References
 Suomen kansallisbiografia  (National Biography of Finland)
  
 

1738 births
1776 deaths
18th-century Finnish poets
18th-century Finnish writers
18th-century Finnish women writers
Finnish women poets